Haifa bint Muhammad Al Saud is a Saudi royal and deputy minister of tourism. Since 2012 she has assumed various government posts.

Early life and education
Haifa bint Muhammad is a member of the Al Saud family. Her father is the grandson of Khalid bin Muhammad Al Saud, the son of Muhammad bin Abdul Rahman Al Saud. She received a bachelor's degree in business administration from the University of New Haven in 2008. She also obtained a master's degree in business administration and management from London Business School, University of London, in 2017.

Career
Following her graduation Haifa bint Muhammad began to work at HSBC, United Kingdom, as an analyst of equity sales. She joined the Saudi ministry of higher education in 2012 where she served as a senior consultant. In the period between 2017 and 2019 she was the managing director at the General Sports Authority. In July 2018 she was appointed secretary-general of Formula E Holdings. 

In January 2020 she was named as a board member of the General Authority of Civil Aviation (GACA). She represents the Saudi Commission for Tourism and National Heritage at the GACA. On 3 July 2022 she was appointed deputy minister of tourism where she had been serving as an assistant minister.

Her other posts include vice chairwoman of the Saudi Fencing Federation and chairwoman of the women’s committee at the Arab Fencing Federation.

References

External links

Haifa
Haifa
Alumni of the London School of Economics
Living people
Haifa
Women economists
Haifa
University of New Haven alumni
Year of birth missing (living people)